Hanna Karnaushenko (born 14 September 1953) is a Ukrainian rower. She competed in the women's coxless pair event at the 1976 Summer Olympics.

References

External links
 

1953 births
Living people
Ukrainian female rowers
Olympic rowers of the Soviet Union
Rowers at the 1976 Summer Olympics
Sportspeople from Zaporizhzhia Oblast
20th-century Ukrainian women